At Gwanghwamun is debut extended play by South Korean singer Kyuhyun. It was released on November 13, 2014, by S.M. Entertainment and distributed by KT Music. The EP features seven tracks in total, including the lead single which shares the same name as the title of the album.

Background
On November 6, 2014, it was announced that Super Junior's youngest member Kyuhyun would be releasing his very first solo mini-album, At Gwanghwamun, which would be released on November 13, making him the fourth solo artist of S.M. Entertainment in a little over a year, following Super Junior-M's Henry (Fantastic), SHINee's Taemin (Ace), and Zhou Mi, another Super Junior-M member who recently had a solo debut stage with Rewind on November 3.

Along with releasing multiple autumn-themed teaser images, the singer has uploaded several short teaser snippets onto his official Twitter account. Each of the teasers were only a few seconds in length, but gave his fans an opportunity to sample the upcoming mini-album.

Release
On November 13, 2014, Kyuhyun released his first EP through various music sites, and the title track on 12 midnight (KST). The lead single immediately took the first spot on nine of real time charts such as MelOn, Genie, Soribada, Daum Music, Naver Music, Mnet, Olleh Music, Bugs and Monkey3, thus achieving an "all-kill". Not only his title song hit the charts, but all of his tracks made their way to top 10 positions in most of the music sites.

On November 26, 2014, Kyuhyun released Chinese version for title track "At Gwanghwamun".

Composition
The title track "At Gwanghwamun" was composed and written by well-known composer of S.M. Entertainment, Kenzie. It is a sad ballad song that talks about painful break-up, giving an autumn feeling that many listeners would love to hear. Kyuhyun's sweet and emotional voice could be heard in the song's background, accompanied by string instruments and drums.

The EP also gained a lot of attention for its track listing, which includes "Eternal Sunshine," composed by the world-famous pianist Yiruma along with 2FACE, as well as "My Thoughts, Your Memories" composed by the artist himself, with lyrics from TVXQ's Changmin who is known to be a good friend of his.

Track listing

Notes
 Track 6 is a cover version of the song under the same title, which was originally performed by South Korean singer-songwriter Lee Moon-se, from his fourth studio album When Love Passes By released in 1987.

Charts

Awards and nominations

Annual music awards

Music program awards

Release history

See also
 List of K-pop on the Billboard charts
 List of number-one albums of 2014 (South Korea)

References

External links
 
 
 
  Kyuhyun's official website 

Cho Kyuhyun EPs
2014 EPs
Korean-language EPs
SM Entertainment EPs